The 2014 New Hampshire gubernatorial election was held on November 4, 2014, to elect the governor of New Hampshire, concurrently with the election to New Hampshire's Class II U.S. Senate seat, as well as other elections to the United States Senate in other states and elections to the United States House of Representatives and various state and local elections.

Incumbent Democratic Governor Maggie Hassan ran for re-election to a second term in office. She defeated the Republican nominee, businessman Walt Havenstein. As of 2022, this is the last time a Democrat was elected Governor of New Hampshire.

Background
Incumbent Democratic Governor John Lynch decided to retire in 2012, rather than seek re-election to a fifth term in office. The Democratic nominee, former State Senate Majority Leader Maggie Hassan, defeated the Republican nominee, attorney and 1996 gubernatorial nominee Ovide M. Lamontagne, 55% to 43%.

New Hampshire and Vermont are the only states in the country whose governors are elected every two years. On only one occasion since 1926 has a first-term governor of New Hampshire been defeated for re-election to a second term: in 2004, when Lynch beat incumbent Republican Governor Craig Benson.

Hassan also had and continues to have high approval ratings. An April 2014 WMUR/University of New Hampshire poll found that 57% of registered voters approved of the job she was doing, 58% had a favorable opinion of her, and 70% thought the state was going in the right direction. For these reasons, Hassan was not considered vulnerable going into the election. The Cook Political Report, Daily Kos Elections, Governing and Sabato's Crystal Ball all considered the race "likely Democratic" and RealClearPolitics and The Rothenberg Political Report rated the race "safe Democratic".

Democratic primary

Candidates

Declared
 Ian Freeman, radio show host
 Maggie Hassan, incumbent Governor
 Clecia Terrio, candidate for the State House in 2012

Hassan won the Democratic Party primary, held on September 9, 2014, with 94.3% of the votes cast.

Republican primary

Candidates

Declared
 Daniel J. Greene
 Walt Havenstein, businessman
 Andrew Hemingway, businessman, Tea Party activist and candidate for Chairman of the New Hampshire Republican State Committee in 2013
 Jonathan Smolin

Havenstein won the Republican Party primary, held on September 9, 2014, with 55.6% of the votes cast.

Declined
 William Harrison Binnie, industrialist, investment banker and candidate for the U.S. Senate in 2010
 Jeb Bradley, Majority Leader of the New Hampshire Senate and former U.S. Representative
 Brad Cook, attorney
 Jeanie Forrester, state senator
 Ted Gatsas, Mayor of Manchester
 Frank Guinta, former U.S. Representative (ran for NH-01)
 Gary Lambert, former state senator (ran for NH-02)
 George Lambert, state representative
 Ovide Lamontagne, businessman, candidate for the U.S. Senate in 2010 and nominee for Governor in 1996 and 2012
 Chuck Morse, state senator
 Bob Odell, state senator
 John Reagan, state senator
 Chuck Rolecek, businessman and candidate for the Executive Council of New Hampshire in 2012
 Andy Sanborn, state senator
 Kevin H. Smith, conservative activist, former State Representative and candidate for Governor in 2012
 John Stephen, former Commissioner of the New Hampshire Department of Health & Human Services and nominee for Governor in 2010
 Christopher Sununu, Executive Councillor, son of former Governor John H. Sununu and brother of former U.S. Senator John E. Sununu (ran for re-election)
 John E. Sununu, former U.S. Senator

Polling

General election

Debates
Complete video of debate, October 22, 2014

Predictions

Polling

Results

References

External links
 New Hampshire gubernatorial election, 2014 at Ballotpedia
 Campaign contributions at FollowTheMoney.org

Official campaign websites
 Maggie Hassan for Governor incumbent
 Walt Havenstein for Governor
 Andrew Hemingway for Governor
 Libertarian Candidates for 2014

2014 New Hampshire elections
2014
2014 United States gubernatorial elections